This is a list of townships in the Canadian province of Ontario. Townships are listed by census division.

Northern Ontario

Northeastern Ontario

Algoma District

Historical/Geographic Townships
Abbott

Aberdeen Additional
Abigo
Abotossaway
Abraham
Acton
Aguonie
Alanen
Alarie
Albanel
Albert
Alderson
Allenby
Allouez
Amik
Amundsen
Anderson
André
Archibald
Arnott
Ashley
Assad
Assef
Asselin
Atkinson
Avis
Awenge
Aweres
Bailloquet
Barager
Barnes
Bayfield
Beange
Beaton
Beaudin
Beaudry
Beauparlant
Beebe
Behmann
Bernst
Bird
Bolger
Boon
Bostwick
Bouck
Bourinot
Bracci
Bray
Breckenbridge
Bridgland
Bright Additional
Bright
Brimacombe
Broome
Broughton
Brule
Bruyere
Buchan
Buckles
Bullock
Butcher
Byng
Cadeau
Cannard
Carmody
Carney
Casson
Chabanel
Challener
Chapais
Charbonneau
Chelsea
Chenard
Chesley Additional
Chesley
Cholette
Clouston
Cobden
Coderre
Coffin Additional
Common
Concobar
Conking
Cooper
Copenace
Corbiere
Corboy
Cowie
Cromlech
Cross
Cudney
Curtis
Cuthbertson
Dablon
Dagle
Dahl
Dambrossio
Daumont
Davieaux
Davin
Day
Deagle
Debassige
Del Villano
Dennis
Deroche
Derry
Desbiens
Doherty
Dolson
Doucett
Downer
Dowsley
Drew
Dubreuilville
Dulhut
Dumas
Duncan
Dunphy
Eaket
Ebbs
Echum
Elgie
Emiry
Ericson
Ermine
Esquega
Esten
Ewen
Fabbro
Farquhar
Fenwick
Ferrier
Fiddler
Finan
Fisher
Flanders
Flanders
Foch
Fontaine
Foucault
Foulds
Frances
Franchère
Franz
Frost
Gaisahk
Galbraith
Gapp
Gaudette
Gaudry
Gaunt
Gerow
Gervais
Gilbertson
Giles
Gilmore
Gisborn
Gladstone
Glasgow
Goodwillie
Gould
Gourlay
Grasett
Greenwood
Grenoble
Grootenboer
Groseilliers
Grossman
Grzela
Guindon
Gunterman
Hadley
Haig
Hallett
Hambleton
Handleman
Haughton
Havilland
Havrot
Hawkins
Hayward
Hembruff
Herrick
Hiawatha
Hilton
Hodgins
Hoffman
Home
Hook
Hornepayne
Hotte
Hughes
Hughson
Hunt
Huotari
Hurlburt
Hynes
Irving
Isaac
Jackson
Jacobson
Jarvis
Jessiman
Jocelyn
Jogues
Johns
Johnson
Jollineau
Joubin
Juillette
Kamichisitit
Kane
Kapuskasing
Kars
Keating Additional
Keesickquayish
Kehoe
Kildare
Killins
Kincaid
Kirkwall
Kirkwood
Knicely
Korah
Labelle
Labonté
Laforme
Laird
Laliberté
Lamming
Landriault
Lane
Larkin
LaRonde
Larson
Lascelles
Lastheels
Laughren
LaVérendrye
Lawlor
LeCaron
Leclaire
Lefebvre
Lefroy
Legarde Additional
Legarde
Legge
Leguerrier
Lehman
Leluk
Lendrum
Lerwick
Lessard
Levesque
Lewis
Ley
Lipton
Lizar
Loach
Lockeyer
Long
Lougheed
Lunkie
Macaskill
Macdonald
Mack
Maeck
Magone
Makawa
Mandamin
Maness
Marjorie
Marne
Martel
Martin
Matthews
Maude
McAughey
McDowell
McEwing
McFarlan
McGiverin
McGowan
McIIveen
McKeough
McMahon
McMurray
McNie
McParland
Meath
Meen
Memaskwosh
Ménard
Menzies
Mercer
Meredith
Michano
Mildred
Minnipuka
Miskokomon
Monestime
Mons
Montgomery
Moorehouse
Morin
Morningstar
Mosambik
Musquash
Nadjiwon
Nagagami
Nahwegezhic
Nameigos
Naveau
Nebonaionquet
Nebotik
Newlands
Nicholas
Nicolet
Noganosh
Norberg
Nouvel
Nuttall
Odlum
Olinyk
Olsen
Oscar
Oshell
Otter
Ouellette
Palmer
Parke
Parkinson
Parrott
Patton
Pawis
Pearkes
Peever
Pelletier
Pennefather
Peterson
Piche
Pine
Plourde
Plummer Additional
Poncet
Poulin
Prescott
Prince
Proctor
Puskuta
Quill
Raaflaub
Rabazo
Radisson
Raimbault
Recollet
Redden
Redsky
Reilly
Renwick
Restoule
Riggs
Rioux
Rix
Rollins
Root
Rose
Rouche
Rowat
Royal
Roy
Runalls
Running
Ruston
Ryan
Sagard
St-Germain
St. Joseph
St. Julian
Sampson
Saunders
Sayer
Scarfe
Scholfield
Scrivener
Shanly
Shawkence
Shedden
Shields
Shingwaukonce
Shulman
Simons
Simpson
Slater
Slievert
Smilsky
Snow
Spragge
Stefansson
Stone
Stoney
Strain
Strickland
Striker
Sturgeon
Suganqueb
Tabobondung
Talbott
Tarbutt
Tarbutt Additional
Tarentorus
Teasdale
Tedder
Templeton
Tennyson
Thessalon
Thompson
Thorp
Tiernan
Tilley
Tilston
Timbrell
Timmermans
Tolmonen
Tronsen
Tupper
Tweedle
Usnac
Vance
VanKoughnet
Varley
Vasiloff
Vibert
Victoria
Viel
Villeneuve
Wagg
Walls
Wardle
Warpula
Waswa
Wawa
Wawia
Way-White
Wells
Welsh
West
White River
Whitman
Wicksteed
Winget
Winkler
Wiseman
Wishart
Wlasy
Woolrich
Worton
Yaremko

Current Municipalities

Town of Blind River
Town of Bruce Mines
Dubreuilville Township
City of Elliot Lake
Hilton Township
Village of Hilton Beach
Hornepayne Township
Huron Shores Township
Jocelyn Township
Johnson Township
Laird Township
Macdonald, Meredith and Aberdeen Additional Township
The North Shore Township
Plummer Additional Township
Prince Township
Shedden Township
St. Joseph Township
City of Sault Ste. Marie
Town of Spanish
Tarbutt Township
Town of Thessalon
Wawa Township
White River Township

Unorganized Areas

Algoma, Unorganized, North Part
Algoma, Unorganized, South East Part

Cochrane District

Historical/Geographic Townships

Abbotsford
Acres
Adair
Adams
Adanac
Agassiz
Agate
Aitken
Alexandra
Amery
Ardagh
Aubin
Auden
Aurora
Avon
Bannerman
Barker
Barlow
Barnet
Beatty
Beck
Belford
Ben Nevis
Beniah
Benoit
Berry
Bessborough
Bicknell
Birdsall
Bisley
Black
Black River
Blackstock
Blakelock
Blount
Bond
Bonis
Bourassa
Bowman
Bowyer
Boyce
Boyle
Bradburn
Bradette
Bradley
Bragg
Brain
Bristol
Brower
Burrell
Burritt
Burstall
Byers
Caithness
Calder
Calvert
Canfield
Cargill
Carman
Carmichael
Carnegie
Caron
Carr
Carroll
Carscallen
Carss
Case
Casgrain
Casselman
Challies
Chipman
Clavet
Clay
Clergue
Clifford
Clive
Clute
Cockshutt
Cody
Colquhoun
Cook
Cote
Coulson
Crawford
Cumming
Currie
Dargavel
Deloro
Dempsay
Denton
DePencier
Devitt
Dokis
Duff
Dundonald
Dunsmore
Dyer
Ebbitt
Ecclestone
Edwards
Egan
Eilber
Eldorado
Elliott
Emerson
Enid
Evelyn
Fauquier
Fenton
Fergus
Findlay
Fintry
Fleck
Ford
Fortune
Fournier
Fox
Frecheville
Freele
Fryatt
Fushimi
Gaby
Galna
Ganong
Garden
Gardiner
Garrison
Geary
Gentles
German
Gill
Glackmeyer
Godfrey
Goldwin
Goodwin
Gowan
Greer
Griffin
Guibord
Guilfoyle
Gurney
Habel
Haggart
Haight
Hambly
Hamlet
Haney
Hanlan
Hanna
Harewood
Harker
Harmon
Heath
Hecla
Heighington
Henderson
Henlay
Hepburn
Hicks
Hillmer
Hislop
Hoblitzell
Hobson
Hogg
Holloway
Homuth
Hopkins
Horden
Howells
Hoyle
Hurdman
Hurtubise
Idington
Inglis
Ireland
Irish
Jamieson
Jessop
Keefer
Kendall
Kendrey
Kennedy
Kenning
Kerrs
Kidd
Kilmer
Kineras
Kingsmill
Kipling
Kirkland
Knox
Kohler
Laidlaw
Lamarche
Lambert
Lamplugh
Landry
Langemarck
Langmuir
Laughton
Leitch
Lennox
Lewers
Lisgar
Little
Loveland
Lowther
Lucas
Mabee
Macdiarmid
Machin
Macklem
Macvicar
Magladery
Mahaffy
Maher
Mahoney
Mann
Marathon
Marceau
Marriott
Marven
Massey
Matheson
Maund
McAlpine
McBrien
McCann
McCart
McCausland
McCoig
McCool
McCowan
McCrea
McCuaig
McEvay
McKnight
McLeister
McMillan
McQuibban
Melba
Menapia
Mewhinney
Michaud
Milligan
Moberly
Montcalm
Moody
Moonbeam
Moose
Morrow
Mortimer
Mountjoy
Mowbray
Mullholland
Mulloy
Mulvey
Munro
Murphy
Nansen
Nassau
Neely
Nesbitt
Nettleton
Newman
Newmarket
Nixon
Noseworthy
Nova
O'Brien
Ogden
Oke
Opasatika
Ophir
Orkney
Ossin
Ottaway
Owens
Parliament
Parnell
Parr
Pearce
Pickett
Pinard
Pitt
Playfair
Pliny
Pontiac
Potter
Poulett
Price
Prosser
Purvis
Pyne
Rand
Rapley
Raven
Raynar
Réaume
Reid
Rickard
Ritchie
Robb
Roebuck
Rogers
Rowlandson
Rykert
St. John
St-Laurent
Sanborn
Sanderson
Sangster
Sankey
Sargeant
Scapa
Scovil
Seaton
Selwyn
Sequin
Shackleton
Shannon
Shaw
Shearer
Sheldon
Sheraton
Sherring
Shetland
Shuel
Singer
Slack
Stapells
Staples
Staunton
Steele
Stimson
Stock
Stoddart
Stoughton
Strachan
Strickland
Stringer
Studholme
Sulman
Sutcliffe
Swanson
Swartman
Sweatman
Sweet
Sydere
Syer
Tannahill
Taylor
Teefy
Teetzel
Thackeray
Thomas
Thorburn
Thorneloe
Thorning
Timmins
Tisdale
Tolmie
Tolstoi
Tomlinson
Torrance
Traill
Tucker
Tully
Turnbull
Tweed
Valentine
Verdun
Wacousta
Wadsworth
Walker
Warden
Wark
Watson
Way
Webster
Weichel
Wesley
Whitesides
Whitney
Wilhelmina
Wilkie
Williamson
Winnington
Wright

Current Municipalities

Black River-Matheson Township
Town of Cochrane
Fauquier-Strickland Township
Town of Hearst
Town of Iroquois Falls
Town of Kapuskasing
Mattice-Val Côté Township
Moonbeam Township
Town of Moosonee
Opasatika Township
Town of Smooth Rock Falls
City of Timmins
Val Rita-Harty Township

Unorganized Areas

Cochrane, Unorganized, North Part
Cochrane, Unorganized, South East Part
Cochrane, Unorganized, South West Part

Manitoulin District

Historical/Geographic Townships

Allan
Assiginack
Barrie Island
Bidwell
Billings
Burpee
Campbell
Carlyle
Carnarvon
Cockburn Island
Dawson
Gordon
Howland
Humboldt
Killarney
Mills
Robinson
Rutherford
Sandfield
Sheguiandah
Tehkummah

Current Municipalities

Assiginack Township
Billings Township
Burpee and Mills Township
Central Manitoulin Township
Cockburn Island Township
Gordon/Barrie Island Township
Town of Gore Bay
Town of Northeastern Manitoulin and the Islands
Tehkummah Township

Unorganized Areas

Manitoulin, Unorganized, West Part

Nipissing District

Historical/Geographic Townships

Airy
Anglin
Angus
Antoine
Askin
Aston
Badgerow
Ballantyne
Banting
Barron
Bastedo
Beaucage
Belfast
Bertram
Best
Biggar
Bishop
Blyth
Bonfield
Boulter
Bower
Boyd
Briggs
Bronson
Burnaby
Butler
Butt
Caldwell
Calvin
Cameron
Canisbay
Canton
Cassels
Chambers
Charlton
Chisholm
Clancy
Clarkson
Clement
Commanda
Crerar
Cynthia
Dana
Deacon
Devine
Dickens
Dickson
Eddy
Edgar
Eldridge
Falconer
Fell
East Ferris
West Ferris
Field
Finlayson
Fitzgerald
Flett
French
Freswick
Garrow
Gibbons
Gladman
Gooderham
Grant
Guthrie
Hammell
Hartle
Hébert
Hobbs
Hugel
Hunter
Joan
Jocko
Kenny
Kirkpatrick
La Salle
Latchford
Lauder
Law
Le Roche
Lister
Lockhart
Loudon
Lyell
Lyman
MacPherson
Master
Mattawan
McAuslan
McCallum
McCraney
McLaren
McLaughlin
McWilliams
Merrick
Milne
Mulock
Murchison
Niven
Notman
Olive
Olrig
Osborne
Osler
Papineau
Pardo
Parkman
Paxton
Peck
Pedley
Pentland
Phelps
Phyllis
Poitras
Preston
Riddell
Sabine
Scholes
Sisk
Springer
Sproule
Stewart
Strathcona
Strathy
Stratton
Thistle
Torrington
Vogt
White
Widdifield
Wilkes
Wyse
Yates

Current Municipalities

Bonfield Township
Calvin Township
Chisholm Township
East Ferris Township
Town of Mattawa
Mattawan Township
City of North Bay
Papineau-Cameron Township
South Algonquin Township
Town of Temagami
Town of West Nipissing

Unorganized Areas

Nipissing, Unorganized, North Part
Nipissing, Unorganized, South Part

Parry Sound District

Historical/Geographic Townships

Armour
Bethune
Blair
Brown
Burpee
Burton
Carling
Chapman
Christie
Conger
Cowper
Croft
East Mills
Ferguson
Ferrie
Foley
Gurd
Hagerman
Hardy
Harrison
Henvey
North Himsworth
South Himsworth
Humphrey
Joly
Laurier
Lount
Machar
McConkey
McDougall
McKellar
McKenzie
McMurrich
Monteith
Mowat
Nipissing
Patterson
Perry
Pringle
Proudfoot
Ryerson
Shawanaga
Spence
Strong
Wallbridge
Wilson

Current Municipalities

The Archipelago
Armour
Village of Burk's Falls
Callander
Carling
Joly
Town of Kearney
Machar Township
Magnetawan Township
McDougall Township
McKellar Township
McMurrich/Monteith Township
Nipissing Township
Town of Parry Sound
Perry Township
Town of Powassan
Ryerson Township
Seguin Township
Village of South River
Strong Township
Village of Sundridge
Whitestone

Unorganized Areas

Laurier Geographic Township (Parry Sound, Unorganized, North East Part)
Parry Sound, Unorganized, Centre Part

Sudbury District

Historical/Geographic Townships

Abbey
Abney
Acadia
Acheson
Addison
Admiral
Afton
Alcona
Alcorn
Allen
Alton
Amyot
Antrim
Appleby
Arbutus
Arden
Armagh
Asquith
Athlone
Attlee
Awrey
Aylmer
Bader
Baldwin
Balfour
Baltic
Battersby
Baynes
Bazett
Beaumont
Beckett
Beemer
Beilhartz
Benneweis
Benton
Beresford
Berlin (changed to Kitchener)
Bernier
Beulah
Bevin
Bigelow
Biggs
Bigwood
Birch
Biscotasi
Blackburn
Blewett
Blezard
Bliss
Bonar
Bordeleau
Borden
Bounsall
Bowell
Brackin
Braithwaite
Breadner
Brébeuf
Broder
Browning
Brunswick
Brutus
Buckland
Bullbrook
Burr
Burrows
Burwash
Busby
Cabot
Caen
Calais
Caouette
Capreol
Carew
Carruthers
Carter
Cartier
Carton
Carty
Cascaden
Casimir
Cassidy
Cavana
Cavell
Caverley
Ceylon
Chalet
Champagne
Chapleau
Chaplin
Chappise
Cherriman
Chester
Chewett
Churchill
Clary
Clifton
Cochrane
Collins
Collishaw
Comox
Connaught
Coppell
Copperfield
Cortez
Cosby
Cosens
Cotton
Cox
Craig
Creelman
Creighton
Crepieul
Crockett
Crothers
Cull
Cunningham
Curtin
Dale
Dalmas
Daoust
D'Arcy
D'Avaugour
Davis
Deans
De Gaulle
Delamere
Delaney
Delhi
Delmage
Demorest
Denison
Dennie
Denyes
Desrosiers
Dieppe
Dill
Dore
Dowling
Drea
Druillettes
Drury
Dryden
Dublin
Dukszta
Dunbar
Dundee
Dunlop
Dunnet
Dupuis
Durban
Earl
Eaton
Eden
Edighoffer
Edinburgh
Edith
Eisenhower
Elizabeth
Ellis
Emerald
English
Engstrom
Eric
Ermatinger
Esther
Ethel
Evans
Fairbairn
Fairbank
Falconbridge
Faust
Fawcett
Fawn
Fingal
Fitzsimmons
Floranna
Foleyet
Foster
Foy
Fraleck
Frater
Fréchette
Frey
Fulton
Gallagher
Gamey
Gardhouse
Garibaldi
Garnet
Garson
Garvey
Genier
Genoa
Gilbert
Gilliland
Gladwin
Goschen
Gough
Gouin
Graham
Green
Greenlaw
Grigg
Groves
Haddo
Haentschel
Hagar
Halcrow
Halifax
Hall
Hallam
Halliday
Halsey
Hammond
Hancock
Hanmer
Hardiman
Harrow
Hart
Hassard
Hawley
Hazen
Heenan
Hellyer
Hendrie
Hennessy
Henry
Hess
Hill
Hodgetts
Hoey
Hollinger
Hong Kong
Hornell
Horwood
Hoskin
Howey
Hubbard
Huffman
Hutcheon
Hutt
Hutton
Hyman
Invergarry
Inverness
Iris
Ivanhoe
Ivy
Jack
Janes
Jasper
Jeffries
Jennings
Joffre
Kalen
Kaplan
Keith
Kelly
Kelsey
Kelso
Kelvin
Kemp
Kenogaming
Kilpatrick
Kitchener
Kosny
Lackner
Lafleche
Lampman
Lang
Langlois
Laura
Leask
Leeson
Leinster
Lemoine
Levack
Lillie
Lincoln
Lipsett
Lloyd
Londonderry
Lorne
Loughrin
Louise
Lynch
MacBeth
Mackelcan
Maclennan
MacMurchy
Mageau
Mallard
Manning
Marconi
Margaret
Marion
Marquette
Marsh
Marshall
Marshay
Martland
Mason
Mattagami
May
McBride
McCarthy
McConnell
McGee
McKim
McKinnon
McLeod
McNamara
McNaught
McNish
McOwen
McPhail
Melrose
Merritt
Middleton
Miramichi
Missinaibi
Moen
Moffat
Moggy
Moher
Mond
Moncrieff
Mongowin
Morgan
Morse
Moses
Mountbatten
Muldrew
Munster
Murdock
Muskego
Nairn
Natal
Neelands
Neill
Neville
Newton
Nimitz
Noble
Norman
Northrup
Nursey
Oates
Ogilvie
Onaping
Oswald
Osway
Panet
Parker
Parkin
Patenaude
Pattinson
Paudush
Paul
Penhorwood
Peters
Pinogrami
Porter
Potier
Racine
Ramsden
Raney
Rathbun
Ratter and Dunnet
Rayside
Reaney
Reeves
Regan
Rennie
Rhodes
Roberts
Roblin
Rollo
Roosevelt
Sadler
St-Louis
Sale
Salter
Sandy
Scadding
Schembri
Scollard
Scotia
Scriven
Seagram
Scord
Selby
Selkirk
Semple
Servos
Sewell
Shakespeare
Sheard
Shelburne
Shelley
Shenango
Sheppard
Sherlock
Sherratt
Shibananing
Shipley
Silk
Singapore
Sladen
Smuts
Snider
Solski
Somme
Sothman
Spanish River
Specht
Stalin
Stetham
Stobie
Stover
Stralak
Strathearn
Street
Strom
Struthers
Stull
Swayze
Sweeny
Symington
Teasdale
Telfer
Tilton
Tofflemire
Togo
Tooms
Topham
Totten
Travers
Trill
Triquet
Truman
Turner
Tyrone
Ulster
Unwin
Valley East
Valin
Venturi
Vernon
Victoria
Vondette
Vrooman
Wakami
Waldie
Warren
Waters
Weeks
Westbrook
Whalen
Wigham
Whitehead
Wigle
Windego
Wisner
Yeo
Zavitz

Current Municipalities

Regional Municipality of Sudbury
Greater Sudbury (single-tier municipality)
Sudbury District
Baldwin Township
Chapleau Township
Town of Espanola
Town of French River
Municipality of Killarney
Town of Markstay-Warren
Nairn and Hyman Township
Sables-Spanish Rivers Township
Town of St. Charles

Unorganized Areas

Sudbury, Unorganized, North Part

Timiskaming District

Historical/Geographic Townships

Alma
Argyle
Armstrong
Arnold
Auld
Baden
Banks
Bannockburn
Barber
Barr
Bartlett
Bayly
Beauchamp
Bernhardt
Blain
Bompas
Boston
Brethour
Brewster
Brigstocke
Bryce
Bucke
Burt
Cairo
Cane
Casey
Catharine
Chamberlain
Charters
Childerhose
Chown
Cleaver
Cole
Coleman
Corkill
Corley
Dack
Dane
Davidson
Donovan
Doon
Douglas
Doyle
Dufferin
Dunmore
Dymond
Eby
Evanturel
Fallon
Farr
Fasken
Firstbrook
Flavelle
Fripp
Gamble
Gauthier
Geikie
Gillies Limit
Grenfell
Gross
Harley
Harris
Haultain
Hearst
Henwood
Hillary
Hilliard
Hincks
Holmes
Hudson
Ingram
James
Katrine
Kerns
Kimberley
Kittson
Klock
Knight
Lawson
Lebel
Leckie
Lee
Leith
Leo
Leonard
Lorrain
South Lorrain
Lundy
Maisonville
Marquis
Marter
McArthur
McElroy
McFadden
McGarry
McGiffin
McKeown
McNeil
McVittie
Medina
Michie
Mickle
Midlothian
Milner
Montrose
Morel
Morrisette
Mulligan
Musgrove
Nicol
Nordica
Ossian
Otto
Pacaud
Pense
Pharand
Powell
Rankin
Rattray
Ray
Raymond
Reynolds
Roadhouse
Robertson
Robillard
Rorke
Savard
Sharpe
Sheba
Shillington
Skead
Smyth
Speight
Teck
Terry
Trethewey
Truax
Tudhope
Tyrrell
Van Hise
Van Nostrand
Wallis
Whitson
Willet
North Williams
Willison
Yarrow

Current Municipalities

Armstrong Township
Brethour Township
Casey Township
Chamberlain Township
Charlton and Dack Township
Town of Cobalt
Coleman Township
Town of Englehart
Evanturel Township
Gauthier Township
Harley Township
Harris Township
Hilliard Township
Hudson Township
James Township
Kerns Township
Town of Kirkland Lake
Larder Lake Township
Town of Latchford
Matachewan Township
McGarry Township
City of Temiskaming Shores
Village of Thornloe

Unorganized Areas

Timiskaming, Unorganized, East Part
Timiskaming, Unorganized, West Part

Muskoka District Municipality

Historical/Geographic Townships

Baxter
Brunel
Cardwell
Chaffey
Draper
Franklin
Freeman
Gibson
Macaulay
McLean
Medora
Monck
Morrison
Muskoka
Oakley
Ridout
Ryde
Sinclair
Stephenson
Stisted
Watt
Wood

Current Municipalities

Town of Bracebridge
Georgian Bay Township
Town of Gravenhurst
Town of Huntsville
Lake of Bays Township
Muskoka Lakes Township

Northwestern Ontario

Kenora District

Historical/Geographic Townships

Agnes
Agnew
Aubrey
Avery
Baird
Ball
Balmer
Barclay
Barrett
Bateman
Belanger
Benedickson
Big Island
Birkett
Block No. 7
Block No. 8
Block No. 9
Block No. 10
Bowerman
Boys
Bradshaw
Breithaupt
Bridges
Britton
Broderick
Brownridge
Buller
Burk
Byshe
Cathcart
Cartrand
Code
Colenso
Connell
Corless
Corman
Costello
Coyle
Daniel
Dent
Desmond
Devonshire
Dewan
Docker
Dome
Drayton
Drope
Ear Falls
Earngey
Echo
Eton
Ewart
Factor
Fairlie
Forgie
Furniss
Gidley
Glass
Godson
Golden
Graves
Goodall
Gour
Grummett
Gundy
Hartman
Haycock
Heyson
Hodgson
Honeywell
Hyndman
Ignace
IIsley
Jackman
Jaffray
Jordon
Killala
Kirkup
Knot
Ladysmith
Langton
Laval
Lomond
Le May
MacFie
MacNichol
MacQuarrie
Mafeking
Malachi
Manross
McAree
McCullagh
McDonough
McGeorge
McIlraith
McMeekin
McNaughton
McNevin
Melgund
Melick
Mitchell
Mulcahy
Mutrie
Norman
Noyon
Osaquan
Pelican
Pellatt
Pettypiece
Phillips
Pickerel
Ponsford
Ranger
Reddit
Red Lake
Redvers
Revell
Rice
Rowell
Rudd
Rugby
Sanford
Satterly
Shaver
Sioux Lookout
Sioux Narrows
Skey
Skimmer
Slaight
Smellie
Southworth
Stokes
Temple
Todd
Tustin
Tweedsmuir
Umbach
Van Horne
Vermillion
Wabigoon
Wainwright
Wauchope
Webb
Willans
Willingdon
Work
Zealand

Current Municipalities

City of Dryden, Ontario
Ear Falls Township
Ignace Township
City of Kenora
Machin
Pickle Lake
Town of Red Lake
Sioux Narrows-Nestor Falls Township
Town of Sioux Lookout

Unorganized Areas

Kenora, Unorganized

Rainy River District

Historical/Geographic Townships

Alberton
Asmussen
Atikokan
Atwood
Alysworth
Baker
Barwick
Bennett
Blue
Burriss
Carpenter
Chapple
Claxton
Croome
Crozier
Curran
Dance
Devlin
Dewart
Dilke
Dobie
Emo
Farrington
Fleming
Fort Frances
Freeborn
Griesinger
Halkirk
Hutchinson
Kingsford
La Vallée
Lash
Mather
Mathieu
McCaul
McCrosson
McCrosson & Tovell
McIrvine
McLarty
Menary
Miscampbell
Morley
Morley Additional
Morson
Nelles
Pattullo
Potts
Pratt
Rainy River
Ramsay Wright
Richardson
Roddick
Roseberry
Rowe
Schwenger
Senn
Shenston
Sifton
Spohn
Sutherland
Tait
Tanner
Tovell
Trottier
Watten
Weaver
Wild Land Reserve
Woodyatt
Worthington

Current Municipalities

Alberton Township
Atikokan Township
Chapple Township
Dawson Township
Emo Township
Town of Fort Frances
La Vallee Township
Lake of the Woods Township
Morley Township
Town of Rainy River

Unorganized Areas

Rainy River, Unorganized

Thunder Bay District

Historical/Geographic Townships

Abrey
Adamson
Adrian
Aldina
Alpha
Ames
Ashmore
Atikameg
Bain
Barbara
Beardmore
Bégin
Bell
Benner
Bertrand
Bickle
Blackwell
Blake
Block No. 1
Block No. 2
Block No. 3
Block No. 4
Block No. 5
Block No. 6
Block No. 7
Bomby
Booth
Boucher
Brothers
Bryant
Bulmer
Byron
Cecil
Cecile
Chevrier
Church
Cockeram
Coldwell
Colliver
Colter
Coltham
Conacher
Conant
Conmee
Corrigal
Cotte
Croll
Crooks
Daley
Danford
Davies
Devon
Dorion
Dorothea
Duckworth
Dye
Elmhirst
Errington
Esnagami
Eva
Exton
Fallis
Fauteux
Fernow
Fletcher
Flood
Foote
Forbes
Fowler
Fraleigh
Fulford
Furlonge
Gemmell
Gertrude
Gibbard
Gillies
Glen
Goldie
Golding
Goodfellow
Gorham
Goulet
Grain
Graydon
Grenville
Gzowski
Hagey
Haines
Hanniwell
Hardwick
Hartington
Heathcote
Hele
Herbert
Hipel
Hogarth
Homer
Horne
Houck
Innes
Inwood
Irwin
Jacques
Jean
Joynt
Jutten
Kilkenny
Killraine
Kirby
Kitto
Klots
Knowles
Kowkash
Laberge
Lahontan
Lamport
Langworthy
Lapierre
Laurie
Lecours
Ledger
Leduc
Legault
Leslie
Lett
Lindsley
Lismore
Longlac
Low
Lybster
Lyon
MacGregor
Manion
Manitouwadge
Mapledoram
Marks
McAllister
McComber
McCoy
McCron
McCubbin
McGill
McGillis
McIntyre
McIvor
McKelvie
McLaurin
McMaster
McQueston
McTavish
Meader
Meinsinger
Michener
Mikano
Moss
Nakina
Neebing
Nickle
Nipigon
O'Connor
O'Meara
O'Neill
Oakes
Oboshkegan
Oliver
Paipoonge
Pardee
Parent
Parry
Patience
Patrick
Pearson
Pic
Pifher
Poisson
Priske
Purdom
Pyramid
Red Rock
Rickaby
Robbins
Roberta
Robson
Rupert
Sackville
Salsberg
Sandra
Savanne
Savant
Schreiber
Scoble
Shabotik
Shibley
Shuniah
Sibley
Smye
Soper
Spooner
Stedham
Stirling
Strange
Strey
Summers
Suni
Syine
Terrace Bay
Trewartha
Tuuri
Upsala
Vincent
Vivian
Walsh
Walters
Wardrope
Ware
Wiggins
Yesno

Current Municipalities

City of Thunder Bay
Conmee Township
Dorion Township
Gillies Township
Municipality of Greenstone
Manitouwadge Township
Town of Marathon
Municipality of Neebing
Nipigon Township
O'Connor Township
Municipality of Oliver Paipoonge
Red Rock Township
Schreiber Township
Shuniah Township
Terrace Bay Township

Unorganized Areas

Thunder Bay, Unorganized

Southern Ontario

Central Ontario

Dufferin County

Historical Townships

Amaranth
East Garafraxa
East Luther
Melancthon
Mono
Mulmur

Current Municipalities

Amaranth Township
East Garafraxa Township
East Luther-Grand Valley Township
Melancthon Township
Town of Mono
Mulmur Township
Town of Orangeville
Town of Shelburne

Haliburton County

Historical/Geographic Townships

Anson
Bruton
Cardiff
Clyde
Dudley
Dysart
Eyre
Glanmorgan
Guilford
Harburn
Harcourt
Havelock
Hindon
Lawrence
Livingstone
Lutterworth
McClintock
Minden
Monmouth
Nightingale
Sherborone
Snowdon
Stanhope

Current Municipalities

Algonquin Highlands Township
Municipality of Dysart et al. (Dysart, Bruton, Clyde, Dudley, Eyre, Guilford, Harburn, Harcourt and Havelock)
Highlands East Township
Minden Hills

Hastings County

Historical/Geographic Townships
Bangor
Carlow
Cashel
Dungannon
Elzevir
Faraday
Grimsthorpe
Herschel
Hungerford
Huntingdon
Lake
Limerick
Madoc
Marmora
Mayo
McClure
Monteagle
Rawdon
Sidney
Thurlow
Tudor
Tyendinaga
Wicklow
Wollaston

Current Municipalities

Town of Bancroft
Town of Deseronto
Carlow/Mayo Township
Municipality of Centre Hastings
Faraday Township
Municipality of Hastings Highlands
Limerick Township
Madoc Township
Marmora and Lake Township
Stirling-Rawdon Township
Tudor and Cashel Township
Municipality of Tweed
Tyendinaga Township
Wollaston Township

Northumberland County

Historical Townships

Alnwick
Brighton
Cramahe
Haldimand
Hamilton
Murray
Percy
Seymour
South Monaghan

Current Municipalities

Alnwick/Haldimand
Municipality of Brighton
Town of Cobourg
Cramahe Township
Hamilton Township
Municipality of Port Hope
Municipality of Trent Hills

Peterborough County

Historical Townships

Anstruther
Asphodel
Belmont
Burleigh
Cavendish
Chandos
Dummer
Douro
Ennismore
Galway
Harvey
Methuen
North Monaghan
Otonabee
Smith

Current Municipalities

Asphodel-Norwood
Cavan-Monaghan
Douro-Dummer
Havelock-Belmont-Methuen
North Kawartha
Otonabee-South Monaghan
Selwyn (formerly Smith-Ennismore-Lakefield)
Trent Lakes (formerly Galway-Cavendish and Harvey)

Simcoe County

Historical Townships

Adjala
Artemesia
Collingwood
Essa
Flos
West Gwillimbury
Innisfil
Mara (from Ontario County)
Matchedash
Medonte
Mono (transferred to Dufferin County
Mulmur (transferred to Dufferin County)
Nottawasaga
Osprey
Oro
North Orillia
South Orillia
Rama (from Ontario County)
St. Vincent (transferred to Grey County)
Sunnidale
Tay
Tecumseth
Tiny
Tosorontio
Uphrasia
Vespra

Current Municipalities

Adjala-Tosorontio Township
Town of Bradford-West Gwillimbury
Clearview Township
Town of Collingwood
Essa Township
Town of Innisfil
Town of Midland
Town of New Tecumseth
Oro-Medonte Township
Town of Penetanguishene
Ramara Township
Severn Township
Springwater Township
Tay Township
Tiny Township
Town of Wasaga Beach

City of Kawartha Lakes

Historical Townships

Victoria County
Bexley
Carden
Dalton
Eldon
Emily
Fenelon
Laxton, Digby and Longford
Digby
Laxton
Longford
Manvers (from Durham County)
Mariposa
Ops
Somerville
Verulam

Current Municipality

City of Kawartha Lakes (Single-tier municipality)

Prince Edward County

Historical Townships

Ameliasburgh
Athol
Bloomfield
Hallowell
Hillier
North Marysburgh
South Marysburgh
Sophiasburgh
Picton
Wellington

Current Municipality

Prince Edward County (Single-tier municipality)

Eastern Ontario

Frontenac County

Historical Townships

Barrie
Bedford
North Canonto
South Canonto
Clarendon
Kennebec
Hinchinbrooke
Howe Island
Kingston
Loughborough
Miller
Olden
Oso
Palmerston
Pittsburgh
Portland
Storrington
Wolfe Island

Current Municipalities

Central Frontenac Township
North Frontenac Township
South Frontenac Township
Frontenac Islands Township

Lanark County

Historical Townships

Bathurst
Beckwith
North Burgess
Dalhousie
Darling
Drummond
North Elmsley
Lanark
Lavant
Montague
Pakenham
Ramsay
North Sherbooke
South Sherbrooke

Current Municipalities

Beckwith Township
Town of Carleton Place
Drummond/North Elmsley Township
Lanark Highlands Township
Town of Mississippi Mills
Montague Township
Town of Perth
Tay Valley Township

Leeds and Grenville United Counties

Historical townships

Leeds County
Bastard
South Burgess
North Crosby
South Crosby
Elizabethtown
South Elmsley
Front of Escott
Front of Leeds and Lansdowne
Front of Yonge
Kitley
Rear of Leeds and Lansdowne
Grenville County
Augusta
Edwardsburgh
South Gower
Oxford
Wolford

Current Municipalities

Athens Township
Augusta Township
Edwardsburgh/Cardinal Township
Elizabethtown-Kitley Township
Front of Yonge Township
Leeds and the Thousand Islands Township
Village of Merrickville-Wolford
North Grenville Township
Rideau Lakes Township
Village of Westport

Lennox and Addington County

Historical Townships

Lennox County
Adolphustown
North Fredericksburgh
South Fredericksburgh
Richmond
Addington County
Abinger
Amherst Island
Anglesea
Ashby
Camden East
Denbigh
Effingham
Ernestown
Kaladar
Sheffield

Current Municipalities

Addington Highlands Township
Town of Greater Napanee
Loyalist Township
Stone Mills Township

Prescott and Russell United Counties

Historical Townships/Municipalities

Prescott County
Alfred
Caledonia
East Hawkesbury
West Hawkesbury
Longueuil
North Plantagenet
South Plantagenet
Russell County
Cambridge
Clarence
Cumberland (transferred to Carleton County)
Russell

Current Municipalities

Alfred and Plantagenet Township
Municipality of Casselman
Champlain Township
City of Clarence-Rockland
East Hawkesbury Township
Town of Hawkesbury
Russell Township
Municipality of The Nation

Renfrew County

Historical Townships

Admaston
Alice
North Algona
South Algona
Bagot
Blythfield
Bromley
Brougham
Brudenell
Buchanan
Burns
Clara
Fraser
Grattan
Griffith
Hagarty
Head
Horton
Jones
Lyndoch
Maria
Matawatchan
McKay
McNab
Pembroke
Petawawa
Radcliffe
Raglan
Richards
Rolph
Ross
Sebastopol
Sherwood
Stafford
Westmeath
Wilberforce
Wylie

Current Municipalities

Admaston/Bromley Township
Town of Arnprior
Bonnechere Valley Township
Brudenell, Lyndoch and Raglan Township
Town of Deep River
Greater Madawaska Township
Head, Clara and Maria Township
Horton Township
Killaloe, Hagarty and Richards Township
Town of Laurentian Hills
Laurentian Valley Township
Madawaska Valley Township
McNab/Braeside Township
North Algona Wilberforce
Town of Petawawa
Town of Renfrew
Whitewater Region Township

Stormont, Dundas and Glengarry United Counties

Historical Townships

Dundas County
Matilda
Mountain
Williamsburgh
Winchester
Glengarry County
Charlottenburgh
Kenyon
Lancaster
Lochiel
Stormont County
Cornwall
Finch
Osnabruck
Roxborough

Current Municipalities

City of Cornwall
North Dundas Township
South Dundas Municipality
North Glengarry Township
South Glengarry Township
North Stormont Township
South Stormont Township

City of Ottawa

Historical Townships

Carleton County
Fitzroy
Gloucester
Goulbourn
North Gower
Huntley
March
Marlborough
Nepean
Osgoode
Torbolton

Current Municipality

City of Ottawa (Single-tier municipality)

Golden Horseshoe

Regional Municipality of Durham

Historical Townships

Durham County
Cartwright
Cavan (transferred to Peterborough County)
Clarke
Darlington
Hope (transferred to Northumberland County)
Manvers (transferred to Victoria County)
Ontario County
Brock
Mara (transferred to Simcoe County)
Pickering
Rama (transferred to Simcoe County)
Reach
Scott
Scugog
Thorah
Uxbridge
Whitby
East Whitby

Current Municipalities

Town of Ajax
Brock Township
Municipality of Clarington
City of Oshawa
City of Pickering
Scugog Township
Uxbridge Township
Town of Whitby

Regional Municipality of Halton

Historical Townships

Halton County
Esquesing
Nassagaweya
Nelson
Trafalgar

Current Municipalities

City of Burlington
Town of Halton Hills
Town of Milton
Town of Oakville

Regional Municipality of Niagara

Historical Townships

Lincoln County
Caistor
Clinton
Gainsborough
Grantham
Grimsby
Louth
Niagara
Welland County
Bertie
Crowland
Humberstone
Pelham
Thorold
Stamford
Wainfleet
Willoughby

Current Municipalities

Town of Fort Erie
Town of Grimsby
Town of Lincoln
City of Niagara Falls
Town of Niagara-on-the-Lake
Town of Pelham
City of Port Colborne
City of St. Catharines
City of Thorold
Wainfleet Township
City of Welland
West Lincoln Township

Regional Municipality of Peel

Historical Townships

Peel County
Albion
Caledon
Chinguacousy
Toronto
Toronto Gore

Current Municipalities

City of Brampton
Town of Caledon
City of Mississauga

Regional Municipality of York

The section of York County north of Metro Toronto eventually became the Regional Municipality of York, and York County was dissolved.

Historical Townships

Georgina
East Gwillimbury
North Gwillimbury
King
Markham
Vaughan
Whitchurch

Current Municipalities

Town of Aurora
Town of East Gwillimbury
Town of Georgina
King Township
City of Markham
Town of Newmarket
City of Richmond Hill
City of Vaughan
Town of Whitchurch-Stouffville

City of Hamilton

Historical Townships

Wentworth County
Ancaster
Barton
Beverley
Binbrook
Caistor
Flamborough East
Flamborough West
Glanford
Onondaga
Saltfleet
Seneca

Current Municipality

City of Hamilton (Single-tier municipality)

York County and Metropolitan Toronto
Historical Townships

East York
Etobicoke
Scarborough
York

In 1953, York Country was split. Metropolitan Toronto was formed by severing from York County:

 East York Township
 Etobicoke Township
 North York Township
 Scarborough Township
Toronto (pre-amalgamation)

and several small municipalities:

 Forest Hill
 Leaside
 Long Branch
 Mimico
 New Toronto
 Swansea
 Weston

These were dissolved in 1967 into the townships, which became boroughs.

Metro Toronto was amalgamated in 1998 into:

City of Toronto (Single-tier municipality, not a part of present York Region)

Southwestern Ontario

Bruce County

Historical Townships

Albemarle
Amabel
Arran
Brant
Bruce
Carrick
Culross
Eastnor
Elderslie
Greenock
Huron
Kincardine
Kinloss
Lindsay
St. Edmund's
Saugeen

Current Municipalities

Municipality of Arran-Elderslie
Municipality of Brockton
Huron-Kinloss Township
Municipality of Kincardine
Municipality of Northern Bruce Peninsula
Town of Saugeen Shores
Municipality of South Bruce
Town of South Bruce Peninsula

Elgin County

Historical Townships

Aldborough
Bayham
South Dorchester
Dunwich
Malahide
Southwold
Yarmouth

Current Municipalities

Town of Aylmer
Municipality of Bayham
Municipality of Central Elgin
Municipality of Dutton/Dunwich
Municipality of West Elgin
Malahide Township
Southwold Township

Essex County

Historical Townships

Anderdon
Colchester North
Colchester South
Gosfield North
Gosfield South
Maidstone
Malden
Mersea
Rochester
Sandwich East
Sandwich South
Sandwich West
Tilbury North
Tilbury West

Current Municipalities

Town of Amherstburg
Town of Essex
Town of Kingsville
Town of Lakeshore
Town of LaSalle
Town of Tecumseh
Town of Leamington
Pelee Township

Grey County

Historical Townships

Artemesia
Bentinck
Collingwood
Derby
Egremont
Euphrasia
Glenelg
Keppel
Holland
Normanby
Osprey
Proton
St. Vincent
Sarawak
Sullivan
Sydenham

Current Municipalities

Town of The Blue Mountains
Chatsworth Township
Georgian Bluffs Township
Municipality of Grey Highlands
Town of Hanover
Municipality of Meaford
City of Owen Sound
Southgate Township
Municipality of West Grey

Huron County

Historical Townships

Ashfield
Colborne
Goderich
Grey
Hay
Howick
Hullett
McKillop
Morris
Stanley
Stephen
Tuckersmith
Turnberry
Usborne
East Wawanosh
West Wawanosh

Current Municipalities

Ashfield-Colborne-Wawanosh Township
Municipality of Bluewater
Central Huron Township
Howick Township
Municipality of Huron East
Municipality of Morris-Turnberry
North Huron Township
South Huron Township

Lambton County

Historical Townships

Bosanquet
Brooke
Dawn
Enniskillen
Euphemia
Moore
Plympton
Sarnia
Sombra
Warwick

Current Municipalities

Brooke-Alvinston
Dawn-Euphemia
Enniskillen
Municipality of Lambton Shores
Village of Oil Springs
Town of Petrolia
Town of Plympton-Wyoming
Village of Point Edward
St. Clair Township
City of Sarnia
Warwick Township

Middlesex County

Historical Townships

Adelaide
Biddulph
Caradoc
Delaware
North Dorchester
Ekfrid
Lobo
London
McGillivray
Metcalfe
Mosa
West Nissouri
Westminster
East Williams
West Williams

Current Municipalities

Adelaide Metcalfe Township
Lucan Biddulph Township
Middlesex Centre Township
Village of Newbury
North Middlesex Township
Southwest Middlesex Township
Strathroy-Caradoc Township
Municipality of Thames Centre

Perth County

Historical Townships

Blanshard
Downie
North Easthope
South Easthope
Ellice
Elma
Fullarton
Hibbert
Logan
Mornington
Wallace

Current Municipalities

Town of North Perth
Perth East Township
Perth South Township
West Perth Township

Wellington County

Historical Townships

Arthur
Eramosa
Erin
West Garafraxa
Guelph
West Luther
Maryborough
Minto
Nichol
Peel
Pilkington
Puslinch

Current Municipalities

Centre Wellington Township
Town of Erin
Guelph/Eramosa Township
Mapleton Township
Town of Minto
Puslinch Township
Wellington North Township

Oxford County

Historical Townships

Blandford
Blenheim
Dereham
East Nissouri
North Norwich
South Norwich
East Oxford
North Oxford
West Oxford
East Zorra
West Zorra

Current Municipalities

Blandford-Blenheim Township
East Zorra-Tavistock Township
Town of Ingersoll
Norwich
South-West Oxford
Town of Tillsonburg
City of Woodstock
Zorra

Regional Municipality of Waterloo

Historical Townships

Waterloo County
North Dumfries
Waterloo
Wellesley
Wilmot
Woolwich

Current Municipalities

City of Cambridge
City of Kitchener
North Dumfries Township
City of Waterloo
Wellesley Township
Wilmot Township
Woolwich Township

Brant County

Historical Townships

Brantford
Burford
South Dumfries
Oakland
Onondaga
Tuscarora

Current Municipality

County of Brant (single-tier municipality)

Municipality of Chatham-Kent

Historical Townships

Kent County
Camden
Chatham
Dover
Harwich
Howard
Orford
Raleigh
Romney
Tilbury East
Zone

Current Municipality

Municipality of Chatham-Kent (Single-tier municipality)

Haldimand County

Historical Townships

Canborough
North Cayuga
South Cayuga
Dunn
Moulton
Oneida
Rainham
Seneca
Sherbrooke
Walpole

Current Municipality

Haldimand County (Single-tier municipality)

Norfolk County

Historical Townships

Charlotteville
Houghton
Middleton
Townsend
North Walsingham
South Walsingham
Windham
Woodhouse

Current Municipality
Norfolk County (Single-tier municipality)

See also
List of township municipalities in Ontario

References

Ontario